Jean Chong is a Singaporean LGBT rights activist. She co-founded Sayoni, an LGBT rights organization, and serves as one of the leaders of the ASEAN Sexual Orientation, Gender Identity and Gender Expression Caucus, an activist collective. Chong holds a master's degree in Human Rights and Democratization.

Life and work 
Chong was raised in Singapore. Growing up as a lesbian, she "always wished there were lesbian role models." She first started in her activism by volunteering with a gay Christian support network, Safehaven, and became their first female vice chairperson. Subsequently, she co-founded an inclusive church, Free (First Realize Everyone is Equal) Community Church and served as their chairperson. Looking to expand her horizons in helping others, she went on to be a part of the core team of an LGBT federation, People Like Us in Singapore. She is also currently a part of the ASEAN SOGIE Caucus, a regional network of South East Asia LGBTIQ groups lobbying for the inclusion of LGBTIQ rights in the ASEAN Human Rights Mechanism.

References 

Singaporean LGBT rights activists
Living people
Lesbians
Singaporean LGBT people
Year of birth missing (living people)